Christopher Charles Benham (born 24 March 1983) is an English cricketer. Benham is a right-handed batsman who bowls right-arm off break.  He was born at Frimley, Surrey.  He attended Yateley School across the county border at Yateley in Hampshire. Making his debut at the professional level for the Hampshire Cricket Board in 2001, he spent nine years playing for Hampshire, before being released by the county after the 2010 season. He is now playing club cricket for Wimbledon CC in the Surrey Championship Premier League whilst working as a financial planner at St James's Place Wealth Management.

Early career
Benham was first associated with Hampshire at the age of ten, becoming a product of the county's academy system. It was in the 2001 Cheltenham & Gloucester Trophy that he made his debut in List A cricket for the Hampshire Cricket Board against the Kent Cricket Board. During the match he was dismissed for a duck by Andy Tutt. Three years later, while attending Loughborough University, Benham made his first-class debut for Loughborough UCCE against Somerset. In 2004, he made three further first-class appearances for the Loughborough UCCE, as well as making his Hampshire debut in the County Championship against Derbyshire. On debut he made his maiden half century, scoring 74 runs.

The following season he became more of a feature in the Hampshire side in the County Championship, but would have to wait until 2006 to make his List A debut for the county, which eventually came against Kent in the 2006 Cheltenham & Gloucester Trophy. Known as an aggressive middle-order batsman, it was in the 2006 Pro40 that he recorded his maiden century and highest score in all formats during his time at Hampshire. He scored an unbeaten 158 in the promotion/relegation match against Glamorgan, helping Hampshire to a 151 run win and promotion to Division One. His performance won him praise from then Hampshire captain Shane Warne, with Warne tipping him as a possible future Hampshire captain. Benham did captain Hampshire, once in a first-class match in 2006 against Loughborough UCCE. At the end of the 2006 season, Benham was awarded the NBC Denis Compton Award.

Later career

Following on from his success in the 2006 season, in which he averaged over 50, he had marked success on the pitch.  In the 2007 Friends Provident Trophy he was a member of Hampshire's runner-up squad, although he did not feature in the final against Durham. Two years later he played a key role in the final of the 2009 Friends Provident Trophy against Sussex. He scored an unbeaten 37 and hit the winning runs as Hampshire won by 6 wickets at Lord's against Sussex. His innings was part of an unbeaten partnership of 67 with wicket-keeper Nic Pothas as Hampshire chased down their target of 220 to win the game. By the end of the 2009 season, he had played 54 one-day matches for Hampshire, scoring 1,564 runs at an average of 36.37, with a high score of 158. He converted his starts in this format more often, making four centuries and seven half centuries. In the first-class format he 2009 County Championship to recorded his first first-class century, making 111 against Loughborough UCCE, before following that up later in the season with a score of 100 against county champions Durham.  The 2009 season was his best with the bat in the first-class format, scoring 316 runs and averaging 45.14.

Come the 2010 County Championship, Benham started the season in the first-class starting XI, but throughout the season he failed to hold down a regular place in the team, due in part to the emergence of batsman James Vince.  He did not feature in any one-day matches in 2010 and played just three Twenty20 fixtures, but was a member of Hampshire's 2010 Friends Provident t20 winning team.  Come the end of the season, he had last featured in the County Championship in August against Yorkshire.  This marked his final first-class match, by which since 2004 he had played in 45 fixtures, scoring 1,975 runs

Release by Hampshire
At the end of the 2010 season he was released by the county in October. Following his release, Benham has stated his desire to still play cricket at the highest level. On 1 March 2011 it was announced that Benham had signed for the Unicorns for the 2011 Clydesdale Bank 40. His debut for the Unicorns came in their first match of the competition against Lancashire, with Benham scoring a single run before being dismissed by Glen Chapple. After a couple of quiet games for the Unicorns, he scored his maiden half century for the team against Essex in May.  Later in May he was offered a trial by Nottinghamshire, before playing for Wiltshire in Minor counties cricket. Benham did not feature in the Unicorns squad for the 2012 Clydesdale Bank 40.

References

External links

1983 births
Living people
Cricketers from Frimley
Alumni of Loughborough University
English cricketers
Hampshire Cricket Board cricketers
Loughborough MCCU cricketers
Hampshire cricketers
Hampshire cricket captains
Unicorns cricketers
Wiltshire cricketers
NBC Denis Compton Award recipients